The lunula, or lunulae (pl.), is the crescent-shaped whitish area of the bed of a fingernail or toenail. 

In humans, it appears by week 14 of gestation, and has a primary structural role in defining the free edge of the distal nail plate (the part of the nail that grows outward).

Appearance
It is located at the end of the nail that is closest to the skin of the finger, but it still lies under the nail. It is not actually white but only appears so when it is seen through the nail. Outlining the nail matrix, the lunula is a very delicate part of the nail structure. If one damages the lunula, the nail will be permanently deformed. Even when the totality of the nail is removed, the lunula remains in place and is similar in appearance to another smaller fingernail embedded in the nail bed.

In most cases, it is half-moon-shaped and has unique histologic features. Examinations concluded that the lunula is an area of loose dermis with lesser developed collagen bundles. It appears whitish because a thickened underlying stratum basale obscures the underlying blood vessels.

The lunula is most noticeable on the thumb; however, not everyone's lunulae are visible. In some cases, the eponychium may partially or completely cover the lunula.

Importance 
The lunula’s location on the newest part of the nail allows assessments to be made about one’s health. In some cases, its absence may indicate an underlying health problem. Some examples of such problems are malnourishment, anemia, kidney failure, and heart disease.

See also
 Nail disease

References

Nail anatomy